Zallar is a village in the Kalbajar District of Azerbaijan.

References

External links 

Populated places in Kalbajar District